Oorvani  is a village in the Aranthangirevenue block of Pudukkottai district, Tamil Nadu, India.

Demographics 

As per the 2001 census, Oorvani had a total population of 344 with 174 males and 170 females. Out of the total population 200 people were literate.

References

Villages in Pudukkottai district